The NOVO7 is a series of Android tablet computers manufactured by the Chinese company Ainol Electronics. The "7" represents the size of the tablet's screen (7 inches); Ainol's other products include the Novo 5 and Novo 8.

History
The first tablets in the Novo 7 line were the Novo 7 Basic and Novo 7 Advanced, released in early 2011. Unlike most competing tablets, the Novo 7 Basic used a MIPS based CPU (1 GHz Ingenic JZ4770 XBurst), while the Advanced had a more common ARM CPU. Both had 800x480 pixel touch screens and were launched with Android 2.2, although the company later released updates to Android 3 and Android 4.

The company released the Novo 7 Paladin in late 2011, which became the world's first Android 4.0 (Ice Cream Sandwich) tablet. Its specifications were similar to the Novo 7 Basic, having a 7-inch touch screen, 1 GHz MIPS processor, 512 MB RAM, 8 to 16 GB of internal flash storage, external microSDHC slot, miniUSB, and Wi-Fi (802.11 b/g/n). Two more tablets, the Aurora and the Elf, were added to the range soon afterwards; both of these tablets used ARM CPUs.

Ainol's latest Novo 7 tablets are the Tornado, Mars,  Elf II and Aurora II. These all have ARM processors, 8GB of internal storage (Elf II also has 16 GB model and all Aurora II – 16 GB) and 7 inch screens. The main difference between the models is the CPU speed and screen resolution: the Tornado has a 1 GHz single-core processor and an 800x480 screen, the Mars has the same processor but a 1024x600 pixel screen, and the Elf II/Aurora II has a dual-core 1.5 GHz processor (currently limited to 1.32 GHz) as well as a 1024x600 screen.

All Novo 7 models have been budget based tablets, having lower specifications than other tablets released at the same time but also a cheaper price. They have all supported Wi-Fi, but none of them have had built-in 3G support.

In August 2012, Ainol released a new flagship tablet, the Novo 7 Fire / Flame, with features that compete with and even exceed many features of other recently released and popular consumer tablets, including the Google Nexus 7 tablet and Kindle Fire. Features of the Novo 7 Fire / Flame include a high-resolution 1280×800 IPS display with a 5-point capacitive multi-touch screen, Full HD 1080p support, 16 GB memory / 1 GB RAM, Android 4.0.4 Ice Cream Sandwich operating system, official access to Google Play (Google Market), a 1.5 GHz AMLogic ARM 2nd generation Cortex-A9 based dual-core CPU, a micro SD storage card slot, an HDMI port, a micro-USB port,  Wi-Fi, Bluetooth wireless connection, 3G access through an external dongle USB device, a 5 MP rear-facing camera with AF and auto flash, and 2 MP front-facing webcam. It also provides for hardware accelerated Flash (access to Flash-based video), features a 3-axis gravity sensor, and contains a 5000 mAh battery.

In September 2012, Ainol announced the release of the Novo 7 Crystal with the latest Android 4.1.1 Jelly Bean. The tablet is set to be made available, for shipment, on 28 September. Novo7 Crystal matches and surpasses the specifications of the Novo 7 Elf II and looks to replace its predecessor. It has a special 7-inch MVA screen with 1024×600 pixel resolution and wide 170° viewing angle.

Software

Android operating system
On 28 March 2012, Ainol released updates to Android 4.0.3 v1.0 (Ice Cream Sandwich) for NOVO7 series. It fixes most of the bugs for [v4.0.3 v0.9] firmware that was released in 7 March 2012.

Community support
Some users are attempting to hack and create scripts to enhance the compatibility of the NOVO7 tablets.

At least two ports of CyanogenMod 9 (Android 4.0.4) have been made and they are said to make the tablets much smoother and faster than the initial ROM: one by Feiyu, and one by Quarx2k

Specifications

(Note:  no GPS )

NOVO7 Devices Table

Notes for NOVO7 Crystal
While it is advertised as 1.5 GHz, the actual CPU speed is only 1.2 GHz. Verified on stock ROM (batch 3, chengnen.tan kernel).

See also
 Android (operating system)
 Android version history
 List of Android devices
 Ingenic Semiconductor
 MIPS architecture
 Comparison of tablet computers
 Ainol

References

External links
 Ainol

Tablet computers
Linux-based devices
Multi-touch
Mobile computers
Touchscreen portable media players
Android (operating system) devices